In enzymology, a glycine formimidoyltransferase is an enzyme that catalyzes the chemical reaction

5-formimidoyltetrahydrofolate + glycine  tetrahydrofolate + N-formimidoylglycine

Thus, the two substrates of this enzyme are 5-formimidoyltetrahydrofolate and glycine, whereas its two products are tetrahydrofolate and N-formimidoylglycine.

This enzyme belongs to the family of transferases that transfer one-carbon groups, specifically the hydroxymethyl-, formyl- and related transferases.  The systematic name of this enzyme class is 5-formimidoyltetrahydrofolate:glycine N-formimidoyltransferase. Other names in common use include formiminoglycine formiminotransferase, FIG formiminotransferase, and glycine formiminotransferase.  This enzyme participates in purine metabolism and one carbon pool by folate.

References

 
 
 

EC 2.1.2
Enzymes of unknown structure